On December 18, 2022, a mass shooting occurred at the Bellaria Residences condominium tower in Vaughan, a suburb north of Toronto, Ontario, Canada. Six people were killed, including the gunman, 73-year-old Francesco Villi, who was shot and killed by responding police officers. Another person was hospitalized with serious but non-life-threatening injuries.

Shooting 
Officers responded to a report of an active shooting at an apartment building in Vaughan at around 7:20 p.m. Upon arrival, they discovered multiple victims. The building, known as Bellaria Residences, is located at 9235 Jane Street. The victims were found on several floors in the building, after the gunman appeared to target three separate units. The gunman was located on a separate floor from the victims.

The gunman, Francesco Villi, was identified as a resident of the building and was reported to have used a semi-automatic handgun.

Victims 
All of the victims were residents of the building. The dead comprised three men and two women. They were Rita Camilleri, 57, and her husband Vittorio Panza, 79; Russell Manock, 75, and his wife Lorraine, 71; and Naveed Dada, 59. 

A 66-year-old woman was also seriously injured and hospitalized. Camilleri, Russell Manock, and Dada were members of the condominium's board of directors.

Perpetrator 
Police identified the gunman as 73-year-old Francesco Villi, who was killed by police in a hallway on the third floor of the building. Some of the building's residents claim that Villi had been involved in a disagreement with the condominium's board of directors. 

Villi stated he was becoming sick by the electromagnets coming off the electrical generator he lived above.  He had a medical note from his doctor.

Court documents also show that Villi sued six directors and officers of the condominium board in 2020, alleging that the directors had deliberately caused him five years of "torment" and "torture", with reference to an electrical room beneath his apartment. He sought a total of C$8,100,000 in damages. The judge struck the case in 2022, ruling that it was "frivolous and/or vexatious". He also gave Villi 30 days to pay $2,500 in court costs.

The condominium's board had obtained a restraining order against Villi in 2018. He was due to return to court on December 19 as the board sought to have him evicted for being a nuisance.

In response to the shooting incident, Villi's three estranged daughters issued a statement expressing their condolences, and also their shock and heartbreak at what had happened. They described their father as having "an aggressive, 'Jekyll and Hyde'-type personality".

Aftermath 
The York Regional Police homicide unit and Ontario's Special Investigations Unit are investigating the incident.

As a result of this and other incidents, sweeping reforms in the condo industry are being called for.

Condolences were offered by Vaughan mayor Steven Del Duca and Ontario premier Doug Ford. Del Duca also ordered all flags to fly at half-mast at all city buildings. Prime minister Justin Trudeau issued a statement offering his condolences and his thanks for the response of first responders.

Over 150 people attended a candlelight vigil to the five victims, on the evening of December 21.

References

External links

2022 murders in Canada
2022 mass shootings in Canada
December 2022 events in Canada
Attacks in Canada in 2022
Crime in Ontario
Deaths by firearm in Ontario
Mass shootings in Canada
Vaughan